Roman Haider (born 13 April 1967) is an Austrian politician who has been a Member of the National Council for the Freedom Party of Austria (FPÖ) since 2008.

References

1967 births
Living people
Members of the National Council (Austria)
Freedom Party of Austria politicians
MEPs for Austria 2019–2024